Charles H. Chapman (1951 – July 15, 2011) was an American jazz guitarist, author, and instructor. He had a four-decade recording career and played with Kenny Burrell and Joe Negri.

Early life and education 
Born in Trenton, New Jersey, Chapman studied at the Berklee College of Music, which offered him a teaching position after he graduated.

Career 
Chapman recorded the tracks for the CDs that accompany the three volumes of the Berklee Modern Method for Guitar by William Leavitt. Chapman wrote over 500 articles and nine books on guitar.

Personal life 
After being diagnosed with cancer, he was unable to continue teaching and retired in 2003. He and his wife moved to Boothbay Harbor, Maine, where they had vacationed for 25 years. At the age of 60, he died of a brain tumor on July 15, 2011.

Works

References

External links
 Biography at Berklee College of Music
 Charles Chapman on Myspace

1950s births
2011 deaths
Guitarists from New Jersey
Musicians from Trenton, New Jersey
Deaths from brain cancer in the United States
American jazz guitarists
American male guitarists
American writers about music
Berklee College of Music faculty
Berklee College of Music alumni
Jazz educators
American male jazz musicians